Perdicinae is a polyphyletic former subfamily of birds in the pheasant family, Phasianidae, regrouping the partridges, Old World quails, and francolins. Although this subfamily was considered monophyletic and separated from the pheasants, tragopans, junglefowls, and peafowls (Phasianinae) till the early 1990s, molecular phylogenies have shown that these two subfamilies actually constitute only one lineage. For example, some partridges (Perdix genus) are more closely affiliated to pheasants, whereas Old World quails and partridges from the Alectoris genus are closer to junglefowls. Due to this, the subfamily Perdicinae is no longer recognized by the International Ornithological Congress, with the species being split among 3 subfamilies.

Perdicinae is a non-migratory Old World group. These are medium-sized birds, and are native to Europe, Asia, Africa, and the Middle East. They are ground-nesting seed-eaters. The subfamily includes the partridges, the snowcocks, the francolins, the spurfowl and the Old World quail.

Species list in taxonomic order

Alectoris
 Arabian partridge, Alectoris melanocephala
 Przevalski's partridge, Alectoris magna
 Rock partridge, Alectoris graeca
 Chukar partridge, Alectoris chukar
 Philby's partridge, Alectoris philbyi
 Barbary partridge, Alectoris barbara
 Red-legged partridge, Alectoris rufa
Ammoperdix
 See-see partridge, Ammoperdix griseogularis
 Sand partridge, Ammoperdix heyi
Arborophila, the hill partridges
 Hill partridge, Arborophila torqueola
 Sichuan partridge, Arborophila rufipectus
 Chestnut-breasted partridge, Arborophila mandellii
 White-necklaced partridge, Arborophila gingica
 Rufous-throated partridge, Arborophila rufogularis
 White-cheeked partridge, Arborophila atrogularis
 Taiwan partridge, Arborophila crudigularis
 Hainan partridge, Arborophila ardens
 Chestnut-bellied partridge, Arborophila javanica
 Grey-breasted partridge, Arborophila orientalis
 Bar-backed partridge, Arborophila brunneopectus
 Orange-necked partridge, Arborophila davidi
 Chestnut-headed partridge, Arborophila cambodiana
 Red-breasted partridge, Arborophila hyperythra
 Red-billed partridge, Arborophila rubrirostris
 Sumatran partridge, Arborophila sumatrana
 Roll's partridge, Arborophila rolli
 Malayan partridge, Arborophila campbelli
 Vietnam partridge, Arborophila merlini
Bambusicola
 Mountain bamboo partridge, Bambusicola fytchii
 Chinese bamboo partridge, Bambusicola thoracica
 Taiwan bamboo partridge, Bambusicola sonorivox
Caloperdix
 Ferruginous partridge, Caloperdix oculea
Campocolinus
 Coqui francolin, Campocolinus coqui
 White-throated francolin, Campocolinus albogularis
 Schlegel's francolin, Campocolinus schlegelii
Coturnix
 Rain quail, Coturnix coromandelica
 Harlequin quail, Coturnix delegorguei
 Common quail, Coturnix coturnix
 Japanese quail, Coturnix japonica
 †New Zealand quail, Coturnix novaezelandiae (extinct)
 Stubble quail, Coturnix pectoralis
Francolinus
 Black francolin, Francolinus francolinus
 Painted francolin, Francolinus pictus
 Chinese francolin, Francolinus pintadeanus
Galloperdix
 Red spurfowl, Galloperdix spadicea
 Painted spurfowl, Galloperdix lunulata
 Sri Lanka spurfowl, Galloperdix bicalcarata
Haematortyx
 Crimson-headed partridge, Haematortyx sanguiniceps
Lerwa
 Snow partridge, Lerwa lerwa
Margaroperdix
 Madagascar partridge, Margaroperdix madagarensis
Melanoperdix
 Black partridge, Melanoperdix nigra
Ophrysia
 Himalayan quail, Ophrysia monorthonyx
Ortygornis
 Crested francolin, Ortygornis sephaena
 Grey francolin, Ortygornis pondicerianus
 Swamp francolin, Ortygornis gularis
Peliperdix
 Latham's francolin, Peliperdix lathami
Perdicula
 Jungle bush quail, Perdicula asiatica
 Rock bush quail, Perdicula argoondah
 Painted bush quail, Perdicula erythrorhyncha
 Manipur bush quail, Perdicula manipurensis
Perdix
 Grey partridge, Perdix perdix
 Daurian partridge, Perdix dauurica
 Tibetan partridge, Perdix hodgsoniae
Rhizothera
 Long-billed partridge, Rhizothera longirostris
 Dulit partridge, ''Rhizothera dulitensis
Pternistis
 Hartlaub's spurfowl, Pternistis hartlaubi
 Mount Cameroon spurfowl, Pternistis camerunensis
 Handsome spurfowl, Pternistis nobilis
 Swierstra's spurfowl, Pternistis swierstrai
 Erckel's spurfowl, Pternistis erckelii
 Djibouti spurfowl, Pternistis ochropectus
 Chestnut-naped spurfowl, Pternistis castaneicollis
 Black-fronted spurfowl, Pternistis atrifrons
 Jackson's spurfowl, Pternistis jacksoni
 Scaly spurfowl, Pternistis squamatus
 Ahanta spurfowl, Pternistis ahantensis
 Grey-striped spurfowl, Pternistis griseostriatus
 Hildebrandt's spurfowl, Pternistis hildebrandti
 Natal spurfowl, Pternistis natalensis
 Red-billed spurfowl, Pternistis adspersus
 Cape spurfowl, Pternistis capensis
 Heuglin's spurfowl, Pternistis  icterorhynchus
 Double-spurred spurfowl, Pternistis bicalcaratus
 Harwood's spurfowl, Pternistis harwoodi
 Clapperton's spurfowl, Pternistis clappertoni
 Yellow-necked spurfowl, Pternistis leucoscepus
 Swainson's spurfowl, Pternistis swainsonii
 Grey-breasted spurfowl, Pternistis rufopictus
 Red-necked spurfowl, Pternistis afer
Rollulus
 Crested partridge, Rollulus rouloul
Scleroptila
 Ring-necked francolin, Scleroptila streptophora
 Grey-winged francolin, Scleroptila afra
 Red-winged francolin, Scleroptila levaillantii
 Finsch's francolin, Scleroptila finschi
 Shelley's francolin, Scleroptila shelleyi
 Moorland francolin, Scleroptila psilolaema
 Orange River francolin, Scleroptila levaillantoides
Synoicus
 Brown quail, Synoicus ypsilophorus
 Snow Mountain quail, Synoicus monorthonyx
 King quail, Synoicus chinensis
 Blue quail, Synoicus adansonii
Tetraogallus
 Caucasian snowcock, Tetraogallus caucasicus
 Caspian snowcock, Tetraogallus caspius
 Himalayan snowcock, Tetraogallus himalayensis
 Tibetan snowcock, Tetraogallus tibetanus
 Altai snowcock, Tetraogallus altaicus
Tetraophasis
 Verreaux's monal-partridge, Tetraophasis obscurus
 Szechenyi's monal-partridge, Tetraophasis szechenyii
Tropicoperdix'
 Green-legged partridge, Tropicoperdix chloropus Chestnut-necklaced partridge, Tropicoperdix charltoniiXenoperdix Rubeho forest partridge, Xenoperdix obscuratus Udzungwa forest partridge, Xenoperdix udzungwensis''

References

Phasianidae